On with the Show may refer to:

Film 
 On with the Show (1921 film), an American film of 1921
 On with the Show! (1929 film), an American musical film

Music 
 On with the Show (Sherbet album)
 On with the Show (Alex Mendham and His Orchestra album)
 "On with the Show", a song by The Rolling Stones from Their Satanic Majesties Request
 "On with the Show", a song by Mötley Crüe from Too Fast for Love
 On with the Show (concert tour), a 2014–15 tour by Fleetwood Mac

See also 
 "On wit da Show", a 1997 song by Kardinal Offishall